Charles Sadron (12 May 1902 – 5 September 1993), was a French physicist who specialized in the study of biological macromolecules.

Biography 

Charles Sadron was professor at the university of Strasbourg. He founded in 1945 the Centre d'Étude de Physique Macromoléculaire (CEPM, Centre for the Study of Macromolecular Physics), renamed in 1954, Centre de Recherche sur les Macromolécules, (CRM, Centre for Macromolecular Research) where he was appointed director until 1967.
In 1967, he moved to Orléans where he became head of the Centre de Biophysique Moléculaire (CBM, Center for Molecular Biophysics).
He was the first laureate of the Holweck Prize, given by the British Institute of Physics in 1946.

In 1985, the CRM and the École d'Application des Hauts Polymères (EAHP, School of Application of High Polymers) were merged into the Institut Charles Sadron (ICS).  The Institut Charles Sadron (UPR 22), is a research center of the CNRS (National Centre of Scientific Research), associated with the University of Strasbourg.

Publications 
 Dynamic aspect of conformation changes in biological macromolecules, Reidel, 1973.

References

External links
 L’Institut Charles Sadron
 Centre National de la Recherche Scientifique

Interviews 
 http://www.ina.fr/economie-et-societe/vie-economique/video/CAF97059039/charles-sadron-les-macromolecules.fr.html
 https://web.archive.org/web/20110720232423/http://www.histcnrs.fr/Sadron.html

French physicists
1902 births
1993 deaths
Academic staff of the University of Strasbourg